is a Japanese light weight powerlifter. He was admitted to the International Powerlifting Federation Hall of Fame in 2007.

References

External links
 Hiroyuki Isagawa Powersport profile 

1953 births
Japanese powerlifters
Living people
People from Naha
Sportspeople from Okinawa Prefecture
World Games silver medalists
World Games gold medalists
Competitors at the 1985 World Games
Competitors at the 1989 World Games
Competitors at the 2005 World Games
Competitors at the 2009 World Games
20th-century Japanese people